Orero is a comune (municipality) in the Metropolitan City of Genoa in the Italian region Liguria, located about  east of Genoa.

Orero borders the following municipalities: Cicagna, Coreglia Ligure, Lorsica, Rezzoaglio, San Colombano Certénoli.

References

External links
 Official website

Cities and towns in Liguria